The men's 4 × 10 kilometre relay cross-country skiing competition at the 2014 Sochi Olympics took place on 16 February at Laura Biathlon & Ski Complex.

In November 2017, Alexander Legkov and Maxim Vylegzhanin were disqualified for doping offences. As a result Russia lost the silver medal. On 1 February 2018, their results were restored as a result of the successful appeal.

Results
The race was started at 14:00.

References

Men's cross-country skiing at the 2014 Winter Olympics
Men's 4 × 10 kilometre relay cross-country skiing at the Winter Olympics